Chet Baker Plays Vladimir Cosma is a 1985 album by jazz trumpeter Chet Baker, released by French company Carrere Records. It features rearrangements of songs written by Romanian film score composer Vladimir Cosma.

Track listing

All songs composed by Vladimir Cosma.

Side A
 "B.B. Blues" – 5:56
 "Yves et Danielle (Thème du film Salut l'artiste)" – 3:28
 "Hobbylog" – 4:53
 "Promenade sentimentale (Thème du film Diva)" – 3:43

Side B
 "12+12 (Thème du film Le jumeau)" – 4:15
 "Two Much" – 4:54
 "Douceurs ternaires" – 4:56
 "Pintade a jeun (Thème du film Nous irons tous au paradis)" – 3:16

Personnel
Chet Baker – trumpet, vocals
Pierre Gossez – saxophone, clarinet
Herve Sellin – piano
Maurice Vander – piano
Jean-Jacques Justafre – French horn
Paul Minck – French horn
Niels-Henning Ørsted Pedersen – double bass
John Guerin – drums

References

Chet Baker albums
1985 albums
Carrere Records albums